Koduvalli (கொடுவள்ளி) is a place in the Thiruvallur district of Tamil Nadu state, India.

References

Villages in Tiruvallur district